Diane Pierce Tudela is a former 3 time US National Champion in Judo.  She has been considered a top 10 female competitor in Judo regardless of weight class.  She competed and earned Gold Medals in the 1974, 1975, and 1977 US National Championships.  She earned a bronze in the US National Championships 1978 as well.  She married fellow Judoka Miguel Tudela.  She was well known for her Arm Bar. She currently serves as a coach in the US Judo Training Center.

Personal life
Diane is from Minnesota. Diane attended Los Angeles Community College.  She is married to Olympian Miguel Tudela

References

Year of birth missing (living people)
Living people
Los Angeles Community College alumni
American female judoka
21st-century American women